Rex Rector (December 28, 1950 – November 5, 2020) was an American politician who served in the Missouri House of Representatives from the 24th district from 2001 to 2007.

He died of a stroke on November 5, 2020, in Harrisonville, Missouri at age 69.

References

1950 births
2020 deaths
Republican Party members of the Missouri House of Representatives
21st-century American politicians